John Bonnyman (born 1920) is a former rugby league footballer who played for Canterbury-Bankstown and New South Wales.

Career
Bonnyman started his career at the Central-Newcastle Rugby League club. He was all set to join St. George Dragons, but changed his mind at the last minute and joined Canterbury-Bankstown.

He went on to play 5 seasons with Canterbury-Bankstown between 1940 and 1945. Bonnyman captained the Berries in their 24–14 loss to the Eastern Suburbs in the 1940 premiership final, although he did score a nice try during the match.

Success followed two years later when he played half-back in the victorious 1942 Grand Final Canterbury team that defeated the St. George Dragons 11–9.

He finished his career at Picton in the late 1940s.

Representative career
Bonnyman represented Country Firsts in 1938 and New South Wales in 1939 - all before joining Canterbury-Bankstown in 1940.

Accolades
He is recognized as Canterbury Bankstown player No. 64.

Bonnyman was selected in the 70th Anniversary Berries to Bulldogs Team of Champions.

References

External links
Bulldogs profile

1920 births
Possibly living people
Australian rugby league players
Canterbury-Bankstown Bulldogs captains
Canterbury-Bankstown Bulldogs players
New South Wales rugby league team players
Place of birth missing
Rugby league halfbacks
Rugby league players from New South Wales